SG Betzdorf is a German association football club from the city of Betzdorf, Rhineland-Palatinate. The team has its origins as a football department established within the gymnastics club Betzdorfer Turnverein on 6 September 1906. The footballers soon became independent as Verein für Jugend- und Volksspiele Betzdorf which was later renamed Betzdorfer Fußball Club 1906.



History
FC was joined by Reichssportverein Betzdorf in 1934 and then was re-united with its parent club Betzdorf TV in 1936 to play as Reichsbahn-SG Betzdorf. The club played second division football on the Bezirksliga Mittelrhein and made failed promotion playoff appearances in 1938 and 1941. They became part of the Gauliga Moselland in 1943 and finished third in the Staffel Ost (Eastern section) of the division. It was intended to resume play in the 1944–45 season with three sections within the division, but by this time Allied armies were entering Germany in the latter stages of World War II and it is not known what teams were able to take the field and how many matches they were able to complete.

Following the war, occupying Allied authorities ordered the dissolution of most organizations in the country, including sports and football clubs. SG disappeared briefly, but was re-established in 1947. The club merged with Eisenbahn-Sportverein Betzdorf in 1962 to form ESG 06 Betzdorf. The combined side made a single season appearance in the Amateurliga Rheinland (III) in 1971–72 but finished last. The union lasted until 1979 when the two sides went their separate ways.

In 1994, SG Betzdorf won promotion to the Oberliga Südwest (IV) for a three-season turn. They were immediately re-promoted out of the Verbandsliga Rheinland (V) and played another two Oberliga seasons. SG returned once again to the Oberliga in 2004, before again being sent down in 2007. The club won promotion to the Oberliga once more in 2007–08 with a Verbandsliga championship. From 2012–13 the Oberliga Südwest was renamed Oberliga Rheinland-Pfalz/Saar, with SGB continuing in this league until 2015 when a last place finish meant relegation.

Honours
 Verbandsliga Rheinland (V)
 Champions: 2004, 2008

Recent seasons
The recent season-by-season performance of the club:

With the introduction of the Regionalligas in 1994 and the 3. Liga in 2008 as the new third tier, below the 2. Bundesliga, all leagues below dropped one tier. In 2012 the Oberliga Südwest was renamed Oberliga Rheinland-Pfalz/Saar.

References

External links
 Official team site
 SG Betzdorf at Weltfussball.de
 Das deutsche Fußball-Archiv historical German domestic league tables 

Football clubs in Germany
Football clubs in Rhineland-Palatinate
Association football clubs established in 1906
1906 establishments in Germany